Alex Ross Perry (born July 14, 1984) is an American filmmaker and actor.

Early life
Perry was born to a Jewish family in 1984 and raised in Bryn Mawr, Pennsylvania, where he worked on a local television news program during high school. After graduating, he moved to New York City to attend NYU. He graduated from NYU's film program in 2006. From 2005 to 2007, Perry worked at the East Village-based video store Kim's Video, where he met many of the cast and crew members who would later work on his films, including director of photography Sean Price Williams. He was influenced by Philip Roth, Vincent Gallo, Jerry Lewis, and Thomas Pynchon.

Career

Perry's first feature, Impolex, premiered in 2009. Made on a budget of $15,000  and shot on 16mm film stock, the film is an absurdist comedy inspired by Thomas Pynchon's novel Gravity's Rainbow. The film was released theatrically in 2011.

Perry's second feature, The Color Wheel, premiered at festivals in 2011. The film, a dark screwball comedy influenced by the work of Philip Roth, was co-written by Perry with Carlen Altman; the two also played the lead roles in the film. The film was named the best undistributed film of 2011 by the Indiewire and Village Voice polls, and placed 12th in a similar poll conducted by Film Comment. It was released theatrically on May 18, 2012.

Perry's next film, a comedy titled Listen Up Philip, premiered at the Sundance Film Festival in 2014.

In 2015, Perry's fourth directorial effort was Queen of Earth, which stars Elisabeth Moss, Katherine Waterston, Patrick Fugit, Kentucker Audley, and Kate Lyn Sheil. It had its world premiere at the Berlin Film Festival on February 7, 2015. and was released in a limited release and through video on demand on August 26, 2015. In April 2015, Disney hired Perry to write a live-action adaptation of the Winnie the Pooh franchise, with the resulting Christopher Robin released to theaters in August 2018. He also optioned Don DeLillo's The Names for a feature adaptation.

In 2017 he directed the music video for Aly & AJ's single "Take Me" and in 2019 also directed the music video for the single Church for the same band.

His films Golden Exits and Her Smell were released in 2018 and 2019, respectively.

In 2022 he directed the music video for Pavement's single "Harness Your Hopes", "Bones" for Soccer Mommy and the long form mockumentary "Metal Myths: Ghost Pt. 2" for Ghost.

Perry’s next project is a documentary-fiction hybrid film about  Pavement, a continuation of his collaboration with the band. The film incorporates concert footage from an original jukebox musical staged by Perry titled Slanted! Enchanted! A Pavement Musical, featuring Zoe Lister-Jones, Michael Esper, and Kathryn Gallagher.

Personal life

In 2016, after nine years of dating, Perry married visual artist Anna Bak-Kvapil. They have one child. Perry is a vegan.

Filmography 

Acting credits

Music videos

References

External links

1984 births
American film producers
American male screenwriters
Film directors from Pennsylvania
Jewish American screenwriters
Living people
People from Bryn Mawr, Pennsylvania
Tisch School of the Arts alumni
Writers from Pennsylvania
American film editors
21st-century American male writers